Concordia is an unincorporated community in Meade County, Kentucky, in the United States.

History
Concordia was incorporated in 1869. A post office called Concordia was established in 1880, and remained in operation until it was discontinued in 1967.

References

Unincorporated communities in Meade County, Kentucky
1869 establishments in Kentucky
Unincorporated communities in Kentucky
Populated places established in 1869